Giovanni Faloci (13 October 1985) is an Italian discus thrower. He competed at the 2020 Summer Olympics, in Discus throw.

Biography
Giovanni Faloci has 9 caps in national team from 2007. In his career, with Italy national athletics team, he participated at one edition of European Athletics Championships (2012), two of the Summer Universiade (2007 and 2011), one of the Mediterranean Games (2009), three of the European Team Championships (2010, 2011, 2013) and in 2013, with 64.77 m fifth best measure of all-time in Italy, he obtained the IAAF Standard for the 2013 World Championships in Athletics.

Progression

Achievements

National titles
He has won ten times the individual national championship.

 Italian Athletics Championships
 Discus throw: 2011, 2013, 2018, 2019, 2020, 2021 (6)
 Italian Winter Throwing Championships
 Discus throw: 2009, 2010, 2012, 2016 (4)

See also
 Italian all-time top lists - Discus throw
 Italy at the 2013 World Championships in Athletics

References

External links
 

1985 births
Living people
People from Umbertide
Italian male discus throwers
Athletics competitors of Fiamme Gialle
Universiade medalists in athletics (track and field)
World Athletics Championships athletes for Italy
Universiade silver medalists for Italy
Italian Athletics Championships winners
Athletes (track and field) at the 2018 Mediterranean Games
Medalists at the 2013 Summer Universiade
Mediterranean Games competitors for Italy
Athletes (track and field) at the 2020 Summer Olympics
Olympic athletes of Italy
Sportspeople from the Province of Perugia
Athletes (track and field) at the 2022 Mediterranean Games